Haiti observes Eastern Standard Time Zone (UTC−5) as standard time, and Eastern Daylight Time (UTC−4) as daylight saving time (DST). DST is observed annually from the second Sunday in March to the first Sunday in November.

IANA time zone database 
In the IANA time zone database, Haiti is given one zone in the file zone.tab—America/Port-au-Prince. "HT" refers to the country's ISO 3166-1 alpha-2 country code. Data for Haiti directly from zone.tab of the IANA time zone database; columns marked with * are the columns from zone.tab itself:

References

External links 
Current time in Haiti at Time.is
Time in Haiti at TimeAndDate

Time in Haiti